Electrochemical skin conductance (ESC) is an objective, non-invasive and quantitative electrophysiological measure. It is based on reverse iontophoresis and (multiple) steady chronoamperometry (more specifically chronovoltametry).

ESC is intended to provide insight into and assess sudomotor (or sweat gland) function  and small fiber peripheral neuropathy.

Description of the ESC measurement 
Currently, ESC measurement can be obtained with the use of a medical device, called Sudoscan.

No specific patient preparation or medical personnel training is required. The measure lasts less than 3 minutes, and is innocuous and non-invasive.

The apparatus consists of stainless-steel electrodes for the hands and the feet which are connected to a computer for recording and data management purposes. To conduct an ESC test, the patients place their hands and feet on the electrodes. Sweat glands are most numerous on the palms of the hands and soles of the feet, and thus well suited for sudomotor function evaluation.

The electrodes are used alternatively as anode or cathode. A direct current (DC) incremental voltage under 4 volts is applied on the anode. This DC, through reverse iontophoresis, induces a voltage on the cathode and generates a current (of an intensity less than 0.3 mA) between the anode and the cathode, related to electro-active ions from sweat reacting with the electrodes. The electrochemical phenomena are measured by the two active electrodes (the anode and the cathode) successively in the two active limbs (either hands or feet), whilst the two passive electrodes allow retrieval of the body potential.

During the test, 4 combinations of 15 different low DC voltages are applied. The resulting Electrochemical Skin Conductances (ESC) for each hand and foot are expressed in µS (micro-Siemens). The test also evaluates the percentage of asymmetry between the left and right side, for both hands and feet ESC, providing an assessment of whether one side is more affected than the other.

Applications 
From a physiological standpoint, the pattern of innervation of the sweat gland—namely, the postganglionic sympathetic nerve fibers—allows clinicians and researchers to use sudomotor function testing to assess dysfunction of the autonomic nervous systems (ANS).

To ensure optimal use and interpretation of the ESC, normative values were defined in adults and children. In addition, reproducibility of the method was assessed under clinical conditions, including both healthy controls and patients with common chronic conditions.

ESC has clinical utility in the evaluation and follow-up of dysautonomia and small fiber peripheral neuropathy which may occur in diseases such as:

Diabetes 
Diabetes and two of its main complications: diabetic neuropathy and autonomic neuropathy. Sensorimotor polyneuropathy (DSPN) is the most common type of polyneuropathy in community-dwelling patients with diabetes, affecting about 25% of them.  The course of DSPN is insidious, though, and up to 50% of patients with neuropathy may be asymptomatic, often resulting in delayed diagnosis. Advanced or painful DSPN may result not only in reduced quality of life, but has been statistically associated with retinopathy and nephropathy, and leads to considerable morbidity and mortality.  The autonomic nervous system (ANS), of which sudomotor nerves are an integral part, is the primary extrinsic control mechanism regulating heart rate, blood pressure, and myocardial contractility. Cardiac autonomic neuropathy (CAN) describes a dysfunction of the ANS and its regulation of the cardiovascular system. CAN is the strongest predictor for mortality in diabetes.  Because early symptoms of CAN tend to be nonspecific, its diagnosis is frequently delayed and screening for CAN should be routinely considered in diabetic patients. Assessment of sudomotor function provides a measure of sympathetic cholinergic function in the workup of CAN.

Amyloidosis 
Amyloidosis such as familial amyloid neuropathy, AL amyloidosis, and AA amyloidosis [publication pending]. During the course of AL amyloidosis, peripheral neuropathy occurs in 10–35% of patients; dysautonomia itself is an independent prognostic factor, and assessment of sweat disturbances is routine in the evaluation of amyloidosis.  ESC may provide a measure of subclinical autonomic involvement, which is not systematically assessed with more sophisticated equipment.

Cystic fibrosis 
The effects of cystic fibrosis on sweat glands were described by Quinton. The performance and potential utility of ESC were assessed in this disease.

Parkinson’s disease 
Assessment of dysautonomia is important for patient follow-up and assessment of sudomotor function can be helpful in daily practice.

Chemotherapy-induced peripheral neuropathy (CIPN) 
Chemotherapy-induced peripheral neuropathy is a common, potentially severe and dose-limiting adverse effect of multiple chemotherapeutic agents.  CIPN can persist long after the completion of chemotherapy and imposes a significant quality of life and economic burden to cancer survivors.  ESC allows for an objective quantification of small fiber impairment and is easy to implement in the clinic.

Sjögren syndrome 
ESC may help in the diagnosis process.

Neuropathic pain 
Neuropathic pain usually manifests in the setting of small fiber neuropathy. Small fiber neuropathy is common and may arise from a number of conditions such as diabetes, metabolic syndrome, infectious diseases, toxins, and autoimmune disorders. The gold standard for diagnosing small fiber neuropathy as the etiology of neuropathic pain is skin biopsy. Sudomotor assessment, an accurate objective technique, could be considered as a good screening tool to limit skin biopsy in patients in whom it is not suitable.

ESC has been evaluated for both early diagnosis of small fiber neuropathy and follow-up of treatment efficacy in each of these conditions.

Foundations: the eccrine sweat glands 
See also sweat gland, eccrine sweat gland and Autonomic nervous system.

The ESC measurement relies on the particularities of the outer-most layer of the human skin, the stratum corneum (SC), which consists of a lipid corneocyte matrix crossed by skin appendages (sweat glands and their follicles). See.

According to Chizmadzhev, the stratum corneum is electrically insulating against DC voltages under 10V and only its appendageal pathways are conductive.

In the hairless skin, such as the palms of the hands and soles of the feet, in contact with the electrodes, the eccrine sweat glands are the principal conductive pathways.

These sweat glands are innervated by the sympathetic autonomic peripheral nervous system.  According to Sato, both adrenergic and cholinergic-muscarinic neurons participate, in the following physiological proportions: adrenergic 2/7 and cholinergic 5/7.

Particularities of the autonomic sympathetic nerve fibers that innervate sweat glands are that they are long (the postganglionic nerves start at the spinal cord and may end at the palm or sole), thin, unmyelinated or thinly myelinated C fibers. Because of these characteristics, they are prone to damage early in many neuropathic processes; assessing sweat gland nerve function, or dysfunction, therefore, can be used as a surrogate for the damage imparted to small caliber sensory nerves in neuropathy.

Stimulation of sweat function 
See Sudomotor function.

Physiological 
During normal physiological function, activation of eccrine sweat glands starts with a “chemical” stimulus. For instance, in the cholinergic pathway (the dominant pathway), this leads to the following sequence, or activation cascade:
 The neurotransmitter acetylcholine binds to its corresponding muscarinic cholinergic receptor on the membrane cells of the sweat gland wall;
 This activates the G proteins coupled to the neuroreceptor;
 The G proteins, or their intracellular messengers, then modulate ion channels, creating an ion flux through the membrane;
 This polarizes the gland to voltages around 10 mV and always less than 100mV electrical potential difference between the two sides of the gland wall

Technological 
For the purposes of measuring Electrochemical Skin Conductance, the sweat glands are activated with an “electrical” stimulus. The applied voltage directly polarizes the gland with voltages between 100 mV to 1000 mV. This induces ion fluxes across the gland wall, depending on the electrochemical gradient of the ions. Because the current applied is high compared to the physiological current, the test could be compared to a “stress test” for sweat glands.

In fact, firm application of the hands and feet against the electrodes blocks physiological sweating, and the active measure extracts electro-active ions (i. e., chloride near the anode, proton near the cathode) and pulls them towards the electrodes.

Alternative methods and technologies 
There are several other clinical tests available to assess sudomotor and/or small fiber function and/or peripheral or cardiac neuropathy. These may employ a measurement target other than the sweat glands, and/or alternate methodologies.

For sudomotor tests, see Sudomotor function; specific clinical assessments include:
 Sympathetic Skin Response (SSR), defined as the variation in electrical potential of the skin due to sympathetic sudomotor outflow,
  Quantitative Sudomotor Axon Reflex Testing (QSART)
 A medical device, called Neuropad which measures sweat production based on a color change in a cobalt II compound from blue to pink to produce a categorical output, semi-quantitative,
 Skin Conductance Response (SCR) or Electrodermal activity (EDA).

References 

Electrophysiology
Electrodiagnosis
Medical assessment and evaluation instruments
Medical procedures
Electrophoresis
Electroanalytical methods
Skin anatomy
Skin physiology
Peripheral nervous system disorders